Rhythm is an upcoming Indian Kannada language musical drama film written, produced and directed by Manju Milan. Manju Milan, Meghasri, Suman, Vinaya Prasad in the lead role, with Girija Lokesh, Shivaram, Mukhyamantri Chandru, Bhavya, Srinivasa Murthy, Mimicry Dayanand, Mahesh Mahadev, Ganesh Reddy, Srinath Vasista in supporting roles. The music is composed by A T Raveesh.

Plot 
Sanju (Manju Milan) is a Singer from Bengaluru, India. Sangeetha (Meghasri) is a Violinist who lives in Singapore and is a Kannadiga. Rest of story goes on how they fall in love & succeed.

Cast 

 Manju Milan as Sanju
 Meghasri as Sangeetha
 Vinaya Prasad as Shantha
 Suman as Sangeetha's father
 Mahesh Mahadev as Music director
 Shivaram as Warden
 Girija Lokesh as Grand mother
 Mukhyamantri Chandru as Grand father
 Ganesh Reddy as Ganesha

Soundtrack 
The music rights for Rhythm were bought by Anand Audio Kannada language. Composer A T Raveesh has scored the music. He has composed five songs in which Manju Milan has penned the lyrics.

Release 
Rhythm completed its censor is scheduled to be theatrically released in 2023 between March to June

References

External links 

Upcoming films
Upcoming Kannada-language films
Films shot in India
Films shot in Singapore
Films shot in Bangalore
Indian musical films
Indian musical drama films